The following is a list of notable deaths in May 2010.

Entries for each day are listed alphabetically by surname. A typical entry lists information in the following sequence:
 Name, age, country of citizenship at birth, subsequent country of citizenship (if applicable), reason for notability, cause of death (if known), and reference.

May 2010

1
Danny Aiello III, 53, American stuntman (Eternal Sunshine of the Spotless Mind, Shooter, Rescue Me), pancreatic cancer.
T. M. Aluko, 91, Nigerian writer.
Mohammad Bahmanbeigi, 90, Iranian educator.
Don Caruth, 59, American politician, minority leader of the West Virginia Senate, brain cancer.
Jean-Louis Dumas, 72, French businessman, Hermès group chairman (1978–2006).
Ramakrushna Gouda, 77, Indian politician.
Antoine Hayek, 81, Lebanese Melkite Greek Catholic prelate, archbishop of Baniyas (1989–2006).
Vytautas Janulionis, 52, Lithuanian glass artist.
Zygmunt Kamiński, 77, Polish Roman Catholic prelate, archbishop of Szczecin-Kamień (1999–2009).
Dragan Kujović, Montenegrin politician, President (2003).
Rob McConnell, 75, Canadian jazz musician, cancer.
Lawrence Paul, 84, Canadian Mi'kmaq tribe leader, chief of the Membertou First Nation (1967–1969).
Helen Wagner, 91, American actress (As the World Turns), cancer.

2
Ann Aldrich, 82, American jurist.
Moshe Hirsch, 86, Israeli Neturei Karta rabbi and anti-Zionist, Palestinian National Authority Minister for Jewish Affairs, after long illness.
André Lamy, 77, Canadian film producer, after long illness.
Andrew McFarlane, 32, Australian motocross racer, accident during practice.
Murray Nicoll, 66, Australian journalist and broadcaster, Ash Wednesday fires commentator, leukaemia.
Santiago Carlos Oves, 68, Argentine film director.
Lynn Redgrave, 67, English actress (Georgy Girl, Gods and Monsters, Tom Jones), breast cancer.

3
Mohammed Abed al-Jabri, 73, Moroccan philosopher and writer.
M Innas Ali, 93, Bangladeshi physicist.
Luigi Amaducci, 86, Italian Roman Catholic prelate, archbishop of Ravenna-Cervia (1990–2000).
Florencio Campomanes, 83, Filipino chess player, President of FIDE (1982–1995).
Stefan Doernberg, 85, German writer and teacher.
Jack Friedman, 70, American businessman, co-founder of Jakks Pacific.
Jimmy Gardner, 85, British character actor (The Curse of the Mummy's Tomb, Harry Potter and the Prisoner of Azkaban, Finding Neverland) .
Karl Kasten, 94, American painter.
Stephen Ledogar, 80, American arms control negotiator, bladder cancer.
Merv McIntosh, 87, Australian football player, heart attack.
Bohumil Němeček, 72, Czech boxer, Olympic gold medalist (1960).
Peter O'Donnell, 90, British writer (Modesty Blaise).
Nick Rogers, 30, American football player (Minnesota Vikings), auto accident.
Kinji Shibuya, 88, American professional wrestler and actor (Mr. T and Tina), natural causes.
El Supremo, 67, Mexican professional wrestler, heart attack.
Garland Warren, 74, Canadian football player (Winnipeg Blue Bombers).
Guenter Wendt, 85, German-born American spacecraft engineer (NASA ), heart failure and stroke.

4
Sheikh Nur Mohamed Abkey, 51-52, Somalian journalist, shot.
David Apter, 85, American political scientist, complications of cancer.
Brita Borg, 83, Swedish actress, singer and variety show artist.
Danny Chandler, 50, American motocross champion, complications from paralysis.
Ángel Cristo, 65, Spanish animal tamer and circus promoter, cardiac arrest.
Bill Dale, 93, Canadian track and field athlete.
Sheena Duncan, 77, South African anti-apartheid campaigner, leader of Black Sash, after long illness.
Ernie Harwell, 92, American baseball sportscaster (Detroit Tigers), cholangiocarcinoma.
Peter Heathfield, 81, British trade unionist.
Sipho Jele, 35, Swazi politician.
Freddy Kottulinsky, 77, German-born Swedish racing driver.
William Lubtchansky, 73, French cinematographer, heart disease.
Denis Obua, 62, Ugandan footballer.
Luigi Poggi, 92, Italian Roman Catholic prelate.
Joan Rendell, 89, British writer.
Dustin Shuler, 61, American sculptor (Spindle), pancreatic cancer.
Hadi Soesastro, 65, Indonesian economist and intellectual, founder of the CSIS, brain hemorrhage.

5
Lucho Barrios, 76, Peruvian bolero singer.
Louis Bisilliat, 79, French cyclist.
Ray Blum, 91, American Olympic speed skater.
Alessandra Codazzi, 88, Italian trade unionist, partisan and politician, Senator (1976-1987).
Marcello Costalunga, 85, Italian Roman Catholic prelate, Titular Archbishop of Aquileia (1991–2001).
Joseph Kearney, 83, American athletic director, pancreatic cancer.
Alfons Kontarsky, 77, German pianist.
Armando Lucero, 68, Argentine sex offender, respiratory infection.
Jack MacDonald, 82, Canadian politician, mayor of Hamilton, Ontario (1977–1980), after long illness.
Max Palevsky, 85, American entrepreneur, philanthropist and art collector.
Harry Siljander, 87, Finnish Olympic bronze medal-winning (1952) boxer.
Giulietta Simionato, 99, Italian mezzo-soprano singer.
Gwyn Thomas, 96, Canadian crime reporter (Toronto Star), natural causes.
Umaru Yar'Adua, 58, Nigerian politician, President (2007–2010), after long illness.

6
Hoàng Cầm, 88, Vietnamese poet and playwright.
Jaroslav Cardal, 91, Czechoslovakian Olympic cross-country skier.
David E. Durston, 88, American film director and screenwriter (I Drink Your Blood), complications from pneumonia.
Guillermo Meza, 21, Mexican footballer (Pumas Morelos), shot.
Giacomo Neri, 94, Italian footballer.
Mildred Ellen Orton, 99, American businesswoman, co-founder of the Vermont Country Store.
Robin Roberts, 83, American baseball player (Philadelphia Phillies), Baseball Hall of Fame inductee, natural causes.
Robert J. Serling, 92, American author, brother of Rod Serling.
Dennis Sharp, 76, British architect, cancer.
Tyler Lambert, 25, Mother of Dana Plato committed suicide

7
Francisco Aguabella, 84, Cuban-born American jazz percussionist, cancer.
Bertha Allen, 75-76, Canadian activist, cancer.
Juan Arcocha, 82, Cuban journalist and writer.
Rane Arroyo, 55, American poet, cerebral hemorrhage.
Anders Buraas, 94, Norwegian journalist.
Babz Chula, 64, American actress (Adventures of Sonic the Hedgehog, The X-Files: I Want to Believe, Double Jeopardy), cancer.
Dick Flowers, 84, American football player (Baltimore Colts).
Pamela Green, 81, British actress and model, leukemia.
Wally Hickel, 90, American politician, Secretary of the Interior (1969–1970), Governor of Alaska (1966–1969, 1990–1994), natural causes.
Billy Kelly, 78, British boxer, after long illness.
Zoran Kurteš, 44, Serbian handball player and coach, cardiac arrest.
Adele Mara, 87, American actress (Sands of Iwo Jima), natural causes.
Fríða Á. Sigurðardóttir, 69, Icelandic author.
Svetozar Stojanović, 78, Serbian philosopher and political theorist.
Flora L. Thornton, 96, American arts patron and philanthropist, pulmonary disease.
Bert L. Vallee, 90, American professor.

8
Bruce Alford, Sr., 87, American football player (New York Yanks), and line judge, cancer.
Shadreck Biemba, 45, Zambian footballer, cancer.
Joaquín Capilla, 81, Mexican Olympic diving four-time medalist, heart failure.
Sir Cecil Clothier, 90, Manx judge and public servant.
Willis Eken, 79, American politician and farmer, member of the Minnesota House of Representatives.
Andrew Hull, 46, Canadian-born film maker, film director and architect, head injury due to cycling accident.
Stefanos Lazaridis, 67, Ethiopian-born Greek stage designer, cancer.
Andor Lilienthal, 99, Russian-born Hungarian chess grandmaster.
Giuseppe Ogna, 76, Italian Olympic cyclist.
Peer Schmidt, 84, German actor, after long illness.
Mark Shannon, 58, American radio personality (KTOK), lymphoid leukemia.
George Susce, 78, American baseball player (Boston Red Sox).
Alan Watkins, 77, British political journalist, renal failure.

9
Danger Ashipala, 62, Namibian police advisor.
Maksymilian Barański, 84, Polish footballer 
Erica Blasberg, 25, American golfer, suicide.
Raymond Bouchex, 83, French Roman Catholic prelate, archbishop of Avignon (1978–2002).
Dean Cetrulo, 91, American fencer, Olympic bronze medalist (1948 Summer Olympics).
Geoffrey Chapman, 80, Australian publisher.
Rita Childers, 95, Irish politician, wife of President Erskine Hamilton Childers.
Zosima Davydov, 46, Russian Orthodox prelate, bishop of Yakutsk and Lensk (since 2004), heart attack.
Hans Dijkstal, 67, Dutch politician, Minister of the Interior and Deputy Prime Minister (1994–1998), cancer.
Francisco Andrés Escobar, 67, Salvadoran actor, journalist and writer.
Lena Horne, 92, American singer and actress (Stormy Weather, The Wiz).
Signe Johansson-Engdahl, 104, Swedish 1924 Olympic diver.
Farzad Kamangar, 32, Iranian activist, execution by hanging.
Craig Kauffman, 78, American painter and sculptor, complications from a stroke and pneumonia.
Teruji Kogake, 77, Japanese Olympic athlete, liver failure.
Mahāprajña, 89, Indian Jain religious leader, supreme head of Svetambar Terapanth, cardiac arrest.
Otakar Motejl, 77, Czech public official, Ombudsman (since 2000), after short illness.
Karl-Heinz Schnibbe, 86, German partisan, World War II resistance fighter.
Edward Uhl, 92, American inventor, co-inventor of the bazooka, heart failure.

10
Allan Andersson, 79, Swedish Olympic skier.
Ike Franklin Andrews, 84, American politician, U.S. Representative from North Carolina (1973–1985).
Albert W. Barney, 89, American jurist, Chief Justice of the Vermont Supreme Court (1974–1982).
Jack Birkett, 75, British dancer, singer and actor.
Giuliana Camerino, 90, Italian handbag designer.
Charles Currey, 94, British sailor, silver medallist at the 1952 Summer Olympics.
Frank Frazetta, 82, American fantasy and science fiction artist, stroke.
Bill Hook, 84, American-born chess player for British Virgin Islands.
Margit Hvammen, 77, Norwegian Olympic Alpine skier.
John Kempe, 92, British schoolteacher, headmaster of Gordonstoun School.
Mac Mohan, 71, Indian actor (Sholay), lung cancer.
Volodymyr Ploskina, 55, Ukrainian football manager and former footballer.
Robert B. Salter, 85, Canadian surgeon.

11
Ian Baker, 86, British architect.
Robert H. Burris, 96, American biochemist.
John Burton, 85, New Zealand cricketer.
John Fugh, 75, American army officer, Judge Advocate General of the U.S. Army, heart attack.
Brian Gibson, 82, English footballer (Huddersfield Town).
Timothy Grubb, 55, British-born American show jumper, Olympic silver medallist (1984 Summer Olympics), heart failure.
Karl-Erik Hult, 74, Swedish football player and manager.
Rauf Jabbarov, 74, Azerbaijani boxing manager, heart attack.
Josef Keck, 59, German Olympic biathlete.
Maciej Kozłowski, 52, Polish actor, complications of hepatitis C.
Richard LaMotta, 67, American inventor of the Chipwich ice cream sandwich, heart attack.
Bud Mahurin, 91, American flying ace, complications from a stroke.
Emmanuel Ngobese, 29, South African footballer, tuberculosis.
Jeff Shaw, 60, Australian politician and jurist, NSW Attorney General (1995–2000), Supreme Court judge (2003–2004), pneumonia.
Doris Eaton Travis, 106, American performer, last surviving Ziegfeld girl, aneurysm.
Bob Watt, 82, Canadian ice hockey player, Olympic gold medalist (1952 Winter Olympics) .

12
Anthony Andeh, 64, Nigerian Olympic boxer.
Dieter Bock, 71, German businessman and multimillionaire, choking.
Phyllis Hodges Boyce, 73, American actress (Gone with the Wind, Star Trek).
Clive Fairbairn, 90, Australian cricketer.
Charlie Francis, 61, Canadian track coach, lymphoma.
Edith Keller-Herrmann, 88, German chess Grandmaster.
Sione Manu'uli Luani, 50, Tongan politician, governor of Vavaʻu (since 2009).
Allan Manings, 86, American television writer (Rowan & Martin's Laugh-In, Good Times), cardiac arrest.
Antonio Ozores, 81, Spanish actor, cancer.
John Warham, 90, New Zealand ornithologist and photographer.
Notable people killed in the crash of Afriqiyah Airways Flight 771:
Joëlle van Noppen, 30, Dutch singer.
Bree O'Mara, 42, South African novelist.

13
Rafael Sanus Abad, 78, Spanish Roman Catholic prelate, Auxiliary Bishop of Valencia (1989–2000).
*Ashaari Mohammad, 73, Malaysian spiritual leader, respiratory infection.
Ruth Chew, 90, American children's author, pneumonia.
Paul Garabedian, 82, American mathematician.
Eddie Garrett, 82, American actor (Looking for Mr. Goodbar, Quincy, M.E.).
*Cinthia Régia Gomes do Livramento, 46, Brazilian politician, Education Secretary (Amazonas), air crash.
Walter Klimmek, 91, German footballer.
Klaus Kotter, 75, German bobsleigh official.
Richard Movitz, 84, American Olympic skier.
Peter Provan, 73, Australian rugby league footballer, Balmain Tigers premiership captain (1969), after long illness.
Rosa Rio, 107, American organist (Tampa Theatre).

14
Ronald Bailey, 92, British diplomat.
Frank J. Dodd, 72, American politician, President of the New Jersey Senate (1974–1975).
*Goh Keng Swee, 91, Singaporean politician, Deputy Prime Minister (1973–1984), after long illness.
Norman Hand, 37, American football player (San Diego Chargers, New Orleans Saints), heart disease.
Rūta Jokubonienė, 80, Lithuanian textile artist.
Milouš Kvaček, 76, Czech football player and manager.
David Maimon, 81, Israeli general, head of Israel Prison Service.
Fred O'Donovan, 80, Irish theatre producer, Chairman of RTÉ Authority (1981–1985).
Skip Away, 17, American thoroughbred racehorse, heart attack.
Edmund Tsaturyan, 73, Armenian politician.
*Frederik van Zyl Slabbert, 70, South African politician, complications from liver disease.

15
Harry Aleman, 71, American gangster and murderer, lung cancer.
Frances Alexander, 90, American politician.
Gabriel Bien-Aimé, Haitian politician, Minister of Education (2006–2008), heart attack.
Armand Caouette, 64, Canadian politician, Member of Parliament (1974–1980).
Juan José Carbó, 83, Spanish cartoonist.
Moshe Greenberg, 81, American rabbi and biblical scholar.
Christian Habicht, 57, German actor, heart attack.
Besian Idrizaj, 22, Austrian footballer, heart attack.
Loris Kessel, 60, Swiss racing driver, leukemia.
Archduke Rudolf of Austria, 90, Austrian nobleman, youngest son of Emperor Charles I and Zita of Bourbon-Parma.
John Shepherd-Barron, 84, British inventor, invented the Automatic Teller Machine.
Bhairon Singh Shekhawat, 86, Indian politician, Vice-President (2002–2007), respiratory infection.

16
Debbie Abono, 80, American band manager.
Ronnie James Dio, 67, American heavy metal singer (Black Sabbath, Rainbow, Dio), stomach cancer.
Frank Dye, 82, British sailor.
Alfonso Escámez, 94, Spanish banker.
Hank Jones, 91, American jazz pianist.
Oswaldo López Arellano, 88, Honduran politician, President (1963–1971, 1972–1975), prostate cancer.
Ingvard Nielsen, 84, Danish Olympic athlete.
Stephen Perry, 55, American television writer (ThunderCats, SilverHawks), homicide. (body discovered on this date)

17
Víctor Selvino Arenhart, 61, Argentine Roman Catholic prelate, Bishop of Oberá (since 2009).
Trevor Brissett, 49, English footballer (Port Vale), cancer.
Judson Crews, 92, American poet.
Ludwig von Friedeburg, 85, German politician and sociologist, Hesse Minister for Education (1969–1974).
Richard Gregory, 86, British psychologist.
Dorothy Kamenshek, 84, American baseball player (All-American Girls Professional Baseball League, 1943–1952).
Yvonne Loriod, 86, French pianist, composer and teacher, widow of Olivier Messiaen.
Mukhran Machavariani, 81, Georgian poet, heart attack.
Vasil Manchenko, 79, Bulgarian Olympic basketball player.
Rafael Nantes, 53, Filipino politician, helicopter crash.
Khattiya Sawasdipol, 58, Thai army general and activist, advisor to the National United Front of Democracy Against Dictatorship (Red Shirts), shot.
Bobbejaan Schoepen, 85, Belgian singer-songwriter and entrepreneur, cardiac arrest.
Fritz Sennheiser, 98, German electrical engineer and entrepreneur, founder of Sennheiser.
George Terlep, 87, American football player (Buffalo Bills) and head coach.
Walasse Ting, 80, Chinese-born American visual artist.

18
Iskender Alptekin, 48, Swiss politician, heart attack.
Fedja Anzelewsky, 91, German art historian.
Shusaku Arakawa, 73, Japanese artist and architect.
Sheila Armstrong, 60, American Olympic fencer.
Martha Bielish, 94, Canadian politician, Senator (1979–1990).
Don Day, 86, Australian politician, New South Wales Minister for Agriculture (1978–1980).
John Gooders, 73, British ornithologist.
Karin Iten, 53, Swiss figure skater.
Edoardo Sanguineti, 79, Italian poet, complications following abdominal aneurysm surgery.
Peter Seaton, 67, American poet, influential in language poetry movement, apparent heart attack.
Devendra Singh, 72, Indian-born American psychologist and educator.
Snow Chief, 27, American Thoroughbred racehorse, euthanized.
Willie Zapalac, 89, American football coach.

19
Martin Cohan, 77, American television writer and producer, creator of Silver Spoons, Who's the Boss?, large cell lymphoma.
Larry Dale, 87, American blues singer and guitarist.
Pierre-Claver Zeng Ebome, 56, Gabonese politician and musician.
Aleksandrs Golubovs, 50/51, Latvian politician, member of the Saeima (since 1995).
Horácio Roque, 66, Portuguese financier, founder of Banco Internacional do Funchal, stroke.
Moishe Rosen, 78, American Baptist minister, founder of Jews for Jesus, after long illness.
Harry Vos, 63, Dutch footballer, cancer.

20
Harry C. Aderholt, 90, American Air Force general.
Herbert Eldemire, 79, Jamaican politician and medical doctor.
Phill Hartsfield, American knifemaker.
Gesang Martohartono, 92, Indonesian singer-songwriter.
Robert L. McNeil, Jr., 94, American chemist and inventor, creator of paracetamol (acetaminophen), heart failure.
Hugh Morris, 80, New Zealand businessman, founder of McDonald's New Zealand.
*Breandán Ó Buachalla, 74, Irish academic, Irish language scholar, heart attack.
Acharya Ramamurti, 97, Indian social activist.
Walter Rudin, 89, Austrian-born American mathematician, Parkinson's disease.
Robert Tralins, 84, American author.
Leonard Wolfson, Baron Wolfson, 82, British businessman, philanthropist and life peer.

21
Adrian Cruickshank, 73, Australian politician, member of the New South Wales Legislative Assembly (1984–1999).
Stan Jones, 78, American football player (Chicago Bears), member of Pro Football Hall of Fame, complications from a stroke.
Anna-Lena Löfgren, 66, Swedish singer.
Bill Long, 78, Irish writer and broadcaster, Ireland's longest surviving heart transplant patient.
Will Munro, 35, Canadian artist, brain cancer.
Howard Post, 83, American cartoonist and animator.
Robert Gordon Rogers, 90, Canadian politician, Lieutenant Governor of British Columbia (1983–1988).
Gerald Roush, 68, American Ferrari expert, heart attack.
Saeed al-Masri, 54, Egyptian member of al-Qaeda, drone attack.
John P. Scott, 76, American politician, member of the New Jersey Senate.
Madan Tamang, 62, Nepali politician, President of Akhil Bharatiya Gorkha League, stabbed.
Driek van Wissen, 66, Dutch poet, intracranial hemorrhage.

22
Martin Gardner, 95, American mathematics and science author.
Hasri Ainun Habibie, 72, Indonesian First Lady (1998–1999), ovarian cancer.
Peter Hall, 88, New Zealand airman, World War II flying ace.
Keith Jessop, 77, British deep sea diver and marine treasure hunter.
Josef Koukl, 83, Czech Roman Catholic prelate, Bishop of Litoměřice (1989–2003).
Michael Kuchwara, 63, American theater critic (Associated Press), idiopathic ischemic lung disease.
Buz Lukens, 79, American politician, U.S. Representative for Ohio (1967–1971; 1987–1990), cancer.
Lwandile Zwelenkosi Matanzima, 39, South African clan leader, ruler of Western Thembuland.
Martin Mulloy, 58, Irish banjo player, drowning.
Gane Todorovski, 81, Macedonian writer and academician.
Veturi, 74, Indian poet and lyricist, cardiac arrest.
Pierre Zimmer, 82, French actor and film director.

23
Princess Leonida Bagration of Mukhrani, 95, Russian Grand Duchess, last Romanov born in Russia.
Beaver, 59, New Zealand jazz singer, sarcoma.
Beto, 43, Portuguese singer, stroke.
Héctor Costa, 80, Uruguayan basketball player, Olympic bronze medalist (1952 and 1956 Summer Olympics).
Gregory Evans, 96, Canadian jurist, Chief Justice of the Supreme Court of Ontario (1976–1985).
David Ginsburg, 98, American lawyer and political insider, heart failure.
José Lima, 37, Dominican baseball player, heart attack.
Ashot Mkhitaryan, 51, Armenian weightlifting and television personality, heart attack.
Simon Monjack, 40, British screenwriter, suspected heart attack.
Marianna O'Gallagher, 81, Canadian Irish Quebecer historian, lung cancer.
Eva Ostwalt, 108, German-born American Holocaust survivor.
Irwin Rosten, 85, American documentary filmmaker (Man: The Incredible Machine, first broadcast in 1975), after short illness.
Wee Willie Webber, 80, American radio and television personality, heart attack.

24
Ray Alan, 79, British ventriloquist, respiratory failure.
Walter Arnold Baker, 73, American lawyer and politician, cancer.
Virendra Bhatia, 63, Indian politician, after short illness.
Tony Bentley-Buckle, 88, Kenyan Olympic sailor.
Tapen Chatterjee, 72, Indian actor (Goopy Gyne Bagha Byne), cardiac arrest.
Maria di Gerlando, 84, American operatic soprano.
Paul Gray, 38, American heavy metal bassist (Slipknot), accidental fentanyl and morphine overdose.
Alejandro López de Haro, 61, Venezuelan photographer, writer and stock broker, complications from surgery.
Raymond V. Haysbert, 90, American business executive and civil rights leader, member of Tuskegee Airmen, heart failure.
Baby Islam, 82, Bangladeshi cinematographer.
Kambozia Jamali, 71, Iranian Olympic footballer.
Morrie Martin, 87, American baseball player, lung cancer.
Rogelio Martínez, 91, American baseball player (Washington Senators).
Petr Muk, 45, Czech pop singer.
Barbara New, 87, British actress (Oh, Doctor Beeching!, You Rang, M'Lord?).
Steve New, 50, British guitarist, cancer.
Eugenia Paul, 75, American actress (Zorro).
Katherine Reback, 59, American screenwriter (Fools Rush In), complications from cancer.
Abdolhamid Rigi, c. 31, Iranian militant, execution by hanging.
Anneliese Rothenberger, 85, German opera singer.

25
Alexander Belostenny, 51, Ukrainian basketball player, lung cancer.
Clifford Grodd, 86, American clothier, President and CEO of Paul Stuart, cancer.
Arthur Herzog, 83, American writer.
Alan Hickinbotham, 84, Australian football player and businessman.
Michael H. Jordan, 73, American business executive, complications of cancer.
Erih Koš, 97, Serbian writer and translator.
Silvius Magnago, 96, Italian politician, Governor of South Tyrol (1960–1989).
Robert Muczynski, 81, American composer of classical music.
Siphiwo Ntshebe, 35, South African opera singer, meningitis.
David Parker, 51, British swimmer, heart attack.
Gabriel Vargas, 95, Mexican cartoonist.

26
Leo Canjels, 77, Dutch footballer.
Jean Constantin, 82, Romanian actor, natural causes.
Marie Corridon, 80, American swimmer, gold medalist (1948 Summer Olympics).
Jesse Hockett, 26, American sprint car racer, electrocution.
John P. Lewis, 89, American economist, expert on economic aid.
Art Linkletter, 97, Canadian-born American radio and television personality (House Party, People are Funny), natural causes.
Judy Lynn, 74, American country music singer, heart failure.
Sir Christopher Moran, 54, British air force officer, Air Chief Marshal of RAF, suspected heart failure.
Kieran Phelan, 60, Irish politician, suspected heart attack.
Pat Stevens, 64, American actress and voice actress (M*A*S*H, Scooby-Doo and Scrappy-Doo), breast cancer.

27
Louise Arnold, 87, American baseball player (AAGPBL)
Harry Brown Bainbridge III, 70, American bishop, lung cancer and heart complications.
John William Finn, 100, American naval officer, oldest living Medal of Honor recipient.
Jerzy Gryt, 88, Polish Olympic wrestler.
Peter J. Hall, 84, British-born American costume designer (Dallas Opera).
Yvonne Howell, 104, American actress.
Jackson Kaujeua, 56, Namibian musician, composer and gospel singer, kidney disease.
Peter Keefe, 57, American animation producer and executive (Voltron, Denver, the Last Dinosaur), throat cancer.
Roman Kozak, 52, Russian theatre actor and director, after long illness.
Payut Ngaokrachang, 81, Thai cartoonist and animator.
Thomas Whisenhant, 63, American serial killer, execution by lethal injection.
Reg White, 74, British Olympic gold medal-winning (1976) sailor.

28
Eddie Barth, 78, American actor (Simon & Simon) and voice actor, heart failure.
Henry Bramwell, 90, American federal judge.
Slim Bryant, 101, American country singer-songwriter.
Gary Coleman, 42, American actor (Diff'rent Strokes), intracranial hemorrhage.
Sir Hugh Ford, 96, British engineer
Ted Innes, 85, Australian politician, member of the Australian House of Representatives (1972–1983).
Robert Middlemiss, 75, Canadian engineer and politician.
Osama Anwar Okasha, 68, Egyptian screenwriter and journalist.
David Sanger, 63, British organist.
Leslie Scalapino, 65, American poet, publisher and playwright.
Torvald Högström, 84, Finnish Olympic cyclist.

29
Akinpelu Oludele Adesola, 82, Nigirean academic.
Adrian Freeman, 24, Irish hurler (Mayo), traffic collision.
Dennis Hopper, 74, American actor (Speed, Blue Velvet) and film director (Easy Rider), prostate cancer.
Paul Müller, 69, German biologist.
Jeriome Robertson, 33, American baseball player (Houston Astros, Cleveland Indians), motorcycle collision.
Donald L. Staheli, 78, American Mormon leader, general authority of The Church of Jesus Christ of Latter-day Saints.
Randolph Stow, 74, Australian writer, liver cancer.

30
José Amedo, 91, Spanish Olympic shooter.
Hanji Aoki, 94, Japanese sports official, heart failure.
Colm Callan, 87, Irish rugby player (1948 Grand Slam), after long illness.
Yuri Chesnokov, 77, Russian Olympic gold medal-winning (1964) volleyball player.
Aryeh Eliav, 88, Israeli politician, after long illness.
Dame Pat Evison, 85, New Zealand actress.
Bruce Harris, 55, British executive director of Casa Alianza (1989–2004), pancreatic cancer.
Lester Johnson, 91, American figurative expressionist artist.
Peter Orlovsky, 76, American poet, lung cancer.
Joan Rhodes, 89, British actress and entertainer.
Jeanne Robinson, 62, American dancer and novelist, wife of Spider Robinson, biliary tract cancer.
Dufferin Roblin, 92, Canadian politician, Premier of Manitoba (1958–1967), Senator (1978–1992).
Vera Beaudin Saeedpour, 80, American Kurdish scholar, founder of the Kurdish Heritage Foundation of America, heart attack.
Robert O. Smith, 67, American actor (Dragonball Z, InuYasha, Transformers: Cybertron).
Brian Turner, 58, Australian footballer, cancer.
Rudi Vis, 69, British politician, MP for Finchley and Golders Green (1997–2010), cancer.
Tobi Wong, 35, Canadian designer, suicide.
Ali-Ollie Woodson, 58, American soul singer (The Temptations), leukemia.

31
İbrahim Bilgen, 61, Turkish politician and engineer, Gaza flotilla raid participant.
Louise Bourgeois, 98, French-born American artist and sculptor.
Uzra Butt, 93, Indian-born Pakistani actress, after long illness.
Emil Clade, 94, German Luftwaffe fighter ace. (exact date of death unknown)
Boyd Converse, 78, American college football coach.
Furkan Doğan, 19, American student, Gaza flotilla raid participant.
Brian Duffy, 76, British photographer, degenerative lung disease.
William A. Fraker, 86, American cinematographer, cancer.
Chris Haney, 59, Canadian co-inventor of Trivial Pursuit, after long illness.
Rubén Juárez, 62, Argentine singer-songwriter and bandoneónist, prostate cancer.
Cevdet Kılıçlar, 38, Turkish journalist and photographer, Gaza flotilla raid participant.
Benjamin Lees, 86, American composer of classical music, heart failure.
Merata Mita, 68, New Zealand filmmaker.
Basilio Santiago Romero, 82, Puerto Rican politician, Comptroller (1971–1977).
Çetin Topçuoğlu, 54, Turkish taekwondo champion and coach, Gaza flotilla raid participant.
Jack Volrich, 82, Canadian politician, Mayor of Vancouver (1976–1980), kidney failure.
Donald Windham, 89, American novelist.

References

2010-05
 05